Macrobius is a prominent lunar impact crater located to the northwest of the Mare Crisium. Its diameter is 63 km. It was named after ancient Roman writer Macrobius. It lies on the southeast edge of the Lacus Bonitatis, a small lunar mare. The somewhat smaller crater Tisserand lies just to the east. 

The outer wall of Macrobius has a multiply terraced inner surface, with some slumping along the top of the rim. The small satellite crater Macrobius C lies across the western rim, but the wall is otherwise relatively free of significant wear. In the center of the floor is a central mountain complex. There is a low ridge in the western interior, but the remainder of the floor is relatively level.

Satellite craters
By convention these features are identified on lunar maps by placing the letter on the side of the crater midpoint that is closest to Macrobius.

The following craters have been renamed by the IAU.
 Macrobius A — See Carmichael.
 Macrobius B — See Hill.
 Macrobius D — See Fredholm.
 Macrobius L — See Esclangon.

References

External links

 LTO-43C2 Macrobius — L&PI topographic map

Impact craters on the Moon